Victorinus Youn Kong-hi (born November 8, 1924) was the third Archbishop, and current Archbishop Emeritus, of the Roman Catholic Archdiocese of Kwangju. Born in Nampho, South Pyongan, North Korea, he was ordained a priest of the Archdiocese of Seoul on March 20, 1950.

On October 7, 1963, he was appointed first Bishop of Suwon. Youn was later promoted to the third Archbishop of Gwangju on October 25, 1973. While Archbishop, he concluded an investigation into claims of Marian miracles at a shrine in Naju. He retired on November 30, 2000.

References

External links
Catholic Hierarchy

1924 births
Living people
People from Nampo
South Korean Roman Catholic archbishops
Roman Catholic archbishops of Gwangju
Roman Catholic bishops of Suwon
Roman Catholic bishops of Gwangju